Beyhan Sultan may refer to:
 Beyhan Sultan (daughter of Selim I) (before 1493 –1559), Ottoman princess
 Beyhan Sultan (daughter of Mehmed III), Ottoman princess 
 Beyhan Sultan (daughter of Ibrahim) (1645–1700), Ottoman princess
 Beyhan Sultan (daughter of Mustafa III) (1766–1824), Ottoman princess